Warham railway station is a request stop on the narrow gauge Wells and Walsingham Light Railway, and serves the small village of Warham. It opened in 1982.

References
 
 

Heritage railway stations in Norfolk
Warham, Norfolk